Avermes is a commune in the Allier department in the Auvergne-Rhône-Alpes region of central France.

The inhabitants of the commune are known as Avermois or Avermoises.

The commune has been awarded two flowers by the National Council of Towns and Villages in Bloom in the Competition of cities and villages in Bloom.

Geography
Avermes is located in the north-east of Allier department in  natural region immediately north-west of Moulins. Access to the commune is by Route nationale N7 which comes from Villeneuve-sur-Allier in the north passing through the heart of the commune, with an exit just north of the town, and continues south-east, bypassing Moulins, to Bessay-sur-Allier in the south. The D707 goes from the exit on the N7 in the commune south through the town urban area continuing to Moulins. The centre of the town is accessed by the D283 which loops through the centre from the D707. The D979A forms the eastern border of the commune as it goes from Moulins north-east to Saint-Ennemond. The D29 branches from the D979A just south of the commune and passes through the east of the commune north to join the D133 east of Aurouër. The D29D links the D979A to the D29 in the east of the commune. Apart from the town there are the districts and hamlets of Chavennes, Les Groiteiers, Ravard, Les Gravettes, Les Plantes, Les Petites-Roches, and L'Etang Chateau. The urban area in the commune spreads along the D707 and along the east bank of the river. The east of the commune is farmland.

The Allier river flows along the western border of the commune and through part of the west of the commune as it flows north to join the Loire just east of Cuffy. An unnamed stream rises in the east of the commune and flows south-west to join the Allier. There are also numerous ponds in the commune.

Neighbouring communes and villages

History
Avermes was mentioned for the first time in the 8th century.

Heraldry

Administration
List of Successive Mayors

Mayors from 1935

Population

Economy

This is the main suburb of Moulins for both leisure and industrial activities with a fairground (Moulins Foirexpo), a cultural multi-purpose hall (Islea), and two metallurgical factories: JPM ex-Chauvat employing about 400 people, and Potain Cranes which employs about 250 people. These are the two largest employers in the commune with ITM (an Intermarché logistics depot with 200 employees), the Leclerc Centre (distribution with 200 employees), Desamais (hardware with 110 employees), and Chapier (DIY store - 50 employees).

Culture and heritage

Civil heritage
The commune has one building that is registered as an historical monument:
The Chateau of Segange (15th century)

Other sites of interest
The Home of Champfeu, dating from the 17th and 18th centuries with the large buildings of the old seminary and the large chapel built in his enclosure in 1925 (Route de Paris).

Religious heritage

The commune has one religious building that is registered as an historical monument:
The Church of Saint Michel or Notre-Dame de la Salette (1871). The church is built in bi-coloured bricks, grey and light grey (Volvic stone).

See also
Communes of the Allier department

References

External links

The Community of the agglomération of Moulins official website 
Averme on the 1750 Cassini Map

Communes of Allier